Akio Ohta (born 3 September 1984) is a Japanese speed skater. He competed in the men's 500 metres event at the 2010 Winter Olympics.

References

External links
 
 

1984 births
Living people
Japanese male speed skaters
Olympic speed skaters of Japan
Speed skaters at the 2010 Winter Olympics
Sportspeople from Hokkaido